Agnocoris is a genus of plant bugs in the family Miridae. There are about seven described species in Agnocoris.

Species
These seven species belong to the genus Agnocoris:
 Agnocoris eduardi Ribes, 1977
 Agnocoris lineata (Distant, 1893)
 Agnocoris pulverulentus (Uhler, 1892)
 Agnocoris reclairei (Wagner, 1949)
 Agnocoris rossi Moore, 1955
 Agnocoris rubicundus (Fallén, 1807)
 Agnocoris utahensis Moore, 1955

References

Further reading

External links

 

Miridae genera
Mirini